The president of Pakistan is the head of state of the Islamic Republic of Pakistan. During the tenure presidents visit different countries. The following is the list of foreign trips of presidents of Pakistan.

Arif Alvi (9 September 2018 – )

Mamnoon Hussain (9 September 2013 – 9 September 2018)

Asif Ali Zardari (9 September 2008 – 8 September 2013) 

President Asif Ali Zardari visited many countries during his tenure. He visited Dubai for 45 times which includes private and official visits.

Pervez Musharraf (20 June 2001 – 18 August 2008)

See also
 List of presidents of Pakistan

References

Presidents of Pakistan
Foreign relations of Pakistan
Pakistan President
Diplomatic visits by heads of state